Acroceras elegans is a species of plant in the grass family. It is found in Madagascar and Réunion.

References

External links 
 Acroceras elegans at Tropicos

Panicoideae
Flora of Madagascar
Flora of Réunion
Plants described in 1955
Taxa named by Aimée Antoinette Camus